Lehri is a commune in Khénifra Province, Béni Mellal-Khénifra, Morocco. At the time of the 2004 census, the commune had a total population of 9424 people living in 1641 households.

Lehri was the location of the famous 1914 battle of the same name between French invaders and Zayanes warriors.

References

Populated places in Khénifra Province
Rural communes of Béni Mellal-Khénifra